The 2009 Australian GT Championship was an Australian national motor racing title sanctioned by the Confederation of Australian Motor Sport for drivers of closed production based sports cars which were either approved by the FIA for GT3 competition or approved by CAMS as Australian GTs. It was the thirteenth Australian GT Championship.

The GT Championship division for FIA GT3 specification vehicles was won by former Carrera Cup racer David Wall driving a Porsche 997 GT3 Cup S for the family owned Wall Racing team, which included race victories at Albert Park, Phillip Island, Eastern Creek and Mount Panorama for a comfortable victory margin of almost 90 points over another former Carrera Cup racer James Koundouris. Veteran Jim Richards, driving Wall's 2008 Carrera Cup car, finished third in the championship. Neither Koundouris or Richards took race wins in the series. The other race winners were Craig Baird, whose Mosler dominated the opening round at Adelaide but the team was sold mid-season leaving Baird without a drive, Dean Grant, whose Lamborghini gained a win at Eastern Creek, and Max Twigg, who debuted a 997 GT3 Cup S similar to Wall's at the final round at Sydney Olympic Park to dominate the event.

The GT Challenge division for older cars, (mostly Porsche 996 Carrera Cup cars and one-make specification Ferraris and Maseratis), was won by Jordan Ormsby whose Porsche GT3-RS dominated the series after Klark Quinn was moved from the Challenge division to the Championship division. Quinn won the first five races for the season prior to that. Michael Loccisano was second driving a 996 Carrera Cup with Keith Wong third driving a Ferrari 360.

The GT Production division for production based sportscars Paul Freestone driving a Chevrolet Corvette Z06 and a HSV Coupé GTS. Lotus Exige drivers Mark O'Connor and Tim Poulton completed the top three.

Teams and drivers

The following teams and drivers competed in the 2009 Australian GT Championship.

Race calendar
The championship was contested over a six-round series. Within each division, each driver could count only his/her best five round results.

Championship standings 
Points score sourced from: 

Note: No points were awarded for the third race at Albert Park as the race was stopped due to incidents on the first lap.

Australian Tourist Trophy
The 2009 Australian Tourist Trophy was awarded by the Confederation of Australian Motor Sport to the driver gaining the highest aggregate points total in the Eastern Creek and Phillip Island rounds of the 2009 Australian GT Championship. The title, which was the twentieth Australian Tourist Trophy, was won by David Wall driving a Porsche 911 GT3 Cup S Type 997.

References

External links
 2009 Race Results Archive Retrieved from Natsoft on 23 December 2009
 2009 AGTC Technical Regulations as archived at web.archive.org on 1 October 2009

Australian GT Championship
GT Championship